The stigma is the receptive tip of a carpel, or of several fused carpels, in the gynoecium of a flower.

Description 

The stigma, together with the style and ovary (typically called the stigma-style-ovary system) comprises the pistil, which is part of the gynoecium or female reproductive organ of a plant. These may be restricted to the apex of the style or, especially in wind pollinated species, cover a wide surface.

The stigma receives pollen and it is on the stigma that the pollen grain germinates. Often sticky, the stigma is adapted in various ways to catch and trap pollen with various hairs, flaps, or sculpturings. The pollen may be captured from the air (wind-borne pollen, anemophily), from visiting insects or other animals (biotic pollination), or in rare cases from surrounding water (hydrophily). Stigma can vary from long and slender to globe shaped to feathery.

Pollen is typically highly desiccated when it leaves an anther. Stigma have been shown to assist in the rehydration of pollen and in promoting germination of the pollen tube. Stigma also ensure proper adhesion of the correct species of pollen. Stigma can play an active role in pollen discrimination and some self-incompatibility reactions, that reject pollen from the same or genetically similar plants, involve interaction between the stigma and the surface of the pollen grain.

Shape 
The stigma is often split into lobes, e.g. trifid (three lobed), and may resemble the head of a pin (capitate), or come to a point (punctiform). The shape of the stigma may vary considerably:

Style

Structure 
The style is a narrow upward extension of the ovary, connecting it to the stigmatic papillae. Occasionally it may be absent, in which case the stigma is described as sessile. Styles are generally tube-like—either long or short. The style can be open (containing few or no cells in the central portion) with a central canal which may be filled with mucilage. Alternatively the style may be closed (densely packed with cells throughout). Most syncarpous monocots and some eudicots have open styles, while many syncarpous eudicots and grasses have closed (solid) styles containing specialised secretory transmitting tissue, linking the stigma to the centre of the ovary. This forms a nutrient rich tract for pollen tube growth.

Where there are more than one carpel to the pistil, each may have a separate style-like stylodium, or share a common style. These are flaps of tissue, running from the perianth tube above the sepal. The stigma is a rim or edge on the underside of the branch, near the end lobes. Style branches also appear on Dietes, Pardanthopsis and most species of Moraea.

In Crocus there are three divided style branches, creating a tube. Hesperantha has a spreading style branch. Alternatively the style may be lobed rather than branched. Gladiolus has a bi-lobed style branch (bilobate). Freesia, Lapeirousia, Romulea, Savannosiphon and Watsonia have bifurcated (two branched) and recurved style branches.

Attachment to the ovary

Terminal (apical) style position refers to attachment at the apex of the ovary and is the most common pattern. In the subapical pattern the style arises to the side slightly below the apex. a lateral style arises from the side of the ovary and is found in Rosaceae. The gynobasic style arises from the base of the ovary, or between the ovary lobes and is characteristic of Boraginaceae.  styles characterise Allium.

Pollination 

Pollen tubes grow the length of the style to reach the ovules, and in some cases self-incompatibility reactions in the style prevent full growth of the pollen tubes. In some species, including Gasteria at least, the pollen tube is directed to the micropyle of the ovule by the style.

See also 
 Gynoecium
 Spadix (botany)

References

Citations

Sources

External links 

 Stigma shape and size - English labels
 Terminal versus gynobasic style Images
 Gynobasic Diagram

Plant reproductive system
Plant morphology
Plant sexuality